Mohammed Abdullah Al-Hadhrami (born 28 October 1979) is a Yemeni politician and diplomat. He is the current ambassador of Yemen to the United States. Previously, he served as minister of the Foreign Affairs.

Education 
Al-Hadhrami holds a Master in Development Policy from the Korean Development Institute, which he gained in 2013, as well as a Master in Diplomacy and International Relations from Fairleigh Dickinson University. He also earned a bachelor's degree from Missouri State University in 2002.

Career 
Al-Hadhrami began his diplomatic career in 2004 and worked at the Yemen Permanent Mission to the United Nations from 2008 to 2012, representing Yemen at the UNDP, UNOPS, and UNFPA Executive Boards. He was deputy chief of mission at the Embassy of the Republic of Yemen in Washington, DC, from 2016 to 2018. In 2019, Al-Hadhrami was appointed the minister of the foreign affairs of Yemen after he served as vice minister of foreign affairs in 2018.

References 

Yemeni diplomats
1979 births
Living people
21st-century Yemeni people
Foreign ministers of Yemen
Ambassadors of Yemen to the United States
First Maeen Cabinet